Seyed Ali Mousavi (born 22 April 1976) is an Iranian former professional footballer who played as a forward.

Club career
Mousavi was born in Khorramshahr, Iran. He played in the German 2. Bundesliga with Fortuna Köln.

International career
Ali Mousavi played for the Iran national football team in the 1998 Asian Games where Iran captured the gold medal. Mousavi was also recalled to the national team during Mansour Pourheidari's tenure.

References

External links

1976 births
Living people
Iranian footballers
Iran international footballers
Association football forwards
Pas players
Esteghlal F.C. players
Bayer 04 Leverkusen players
SC Fortuna Köln players
2. Bundesliga players
Iranian expatriate footballers
Expatriate footballers in Germany
Foolad FC players
F.C. Aboomoslem players
Homa F.C. players
People from Khorramshahr
Al-Moussawi family
Iranian Arab sportspeople
Asian Games gold medalists for Iran
1996 AFC Asian Cup players
Asian Games medalists in football
Footballers at the 1998 Asian Games
Medalists at the 1998 Asian Games
Iranian expatriate sportspeople in Germany
Sportspeople from Khuzestan province
21st-century Iranian people